The Calçado River is a river of Rio de Janeiro state in southeastern Brazil, South America.
It is a tributary of the Paraíba do Sul.

In its upper reaches the Calçado River forms the boundary of the Pedra das Flores Natural Monument in the municipality of São José do Vale do Rio Preto.

See also
List of rivers of Rio de Janeiro

References

Rivers of Rio de Janeiro (state)